Necronomicon is a 2006 album by The Devil'z Rejects, a duo consisting of Jedi Mind Tricks member Jus Allah and Boston rapper Bomshot. The album was allegedly released without the knowledge of Jus Allah and many of the album's contributors. It's been rumored that Bomshot, a former label-mate of Jus on Virtuoso's Omnipotent Records, stole the masters for Jus' original unreleased version of All Fates Have Changed, and crafted the album himself. The album features production from Kingston of Blue Sky Black Death and Snowgoons, and guest appearances from GZA, U-God, Snacky Chan, Chief Kamachi, Shabazz the Disciple and Virtuoso. The album received moderately positive reviews, due to the production and Jus' vocals. Necronomicon received little attention, but sold moderately well online, reaching the top 10 on the bestsellers list for both January and February 2007.

Tracks 23-26 are bonus tracks featured on the Limited Edition re-release.

Track listing

References

2006 albums
East Coast hip hop albums